John Halle (c. 1529/1530 – c. 1568) was an English surgeon, medical writer and poet.

John Halle may also refer to:

John Halle (MP for Dover) (died 1409)
John Halle (MP for Sussex), represented Sussex
John Halle (?–1479), wool merchant and Mayor of Salisbury, builder of John Halle's Hall

See also
John Hall (disambiguation)